Radoš Protić (born 31 January 1987) is a Serbian footballer who plays for Železničar Pančevo.

Club career
On 28 June 2021, he signed with Železničar Pančevo.

Career statistics

Honours
Sarajevo
Premier League of Bosnia and Herzegovina: 2014–15

References

External links

Radoš Protić Stats at Utakmica.rs
 

1987 births
Sportspeople from Sremska Mitrovica
Living people
Serbian footballers
Association football defenders
FK Rad players
FK Teleoptik players
FK Leotar players
FK Mačva Šabac players
FK Jagodina players
FC Oleksandriya players
FK Novi Pazar players
FK Sarajevo players
FK Mladost Lučani players
Kisvárda FC players
FK Inđija players
FK Železničar Pančevo players
Serbian SuperLiga players
Premier League of Bosnia and Herzegovina players
Ukrainian Premier League players
Ukrainian First League players
Nemzeti Bajnokság I players
Serbian First League players
Serbian expatriate footballers
Expatriate footballers in Bosnia and Herzegovina
Serbian expatriate sportspeople in Bosnia and Herzegovina
Expatriate footballers in Ukraine
Serbian expatriate sportspeople in Ukraine
Expatriate footballers in Hungary
Serbian expatriate sportspeople in Hungary